Ecasound is a hard-disk recording and audio processing tool for Unix-like computer operating systems including Linux, Mac OS X, and FreeBSD.

Ecasound allows flexible interconnection of audio inputs, files, outputs, and effects algorithms, realtime-controllable by builtin oscillators, MIDI, or interprocess communication via GUI front-end. Ecasound supports JACK and LADSPA effects plug-ins.

The team leader is Kai Vehmanen, with dozens of contributors.  Kai joined the project in 1995, when it was called wavstat, a simple DSP utility running under OS/2. Available under the GNU General Public License, Ecasound is free software.

User Interface

Ecasound is a command-line tool: it does not include a native graphical interface.  Major tasks (recording, mixdown) can be easily performed directly from the command line interface, or by scripts. Several GUI front-ends have been written for it:

 EcaEnveloptor – Creates envelopes for ecasound objects, requires PyGTK & pyecasound. Non-realtime. By Arto Hamara (13/06/2001)
 Nama – multi-track recorder, mixer and mastering application. Tk and ReadLine interfaces. By Joel Roth (13/01/2010)
 EMi (Ecasound Mastering interface) – virtual rack-mount effect. Python-based. By Felix Le Blanc (27/04/2006)
 GAS (Graphical Audio Sequencer) – multi-track recording and mixing. GTK based.  by Luke Tindall. (2001) (?-site down)
 TkEca – Controls almost all features: multi-track recorder/mixer. Tcl/Tk interface. By Luis Gasparotto (29/01/2004)
 Visecas – Preserves Ecasound semantics: edits chains & audio objects, not tracks/regions. GTK+-based. By Jan Weil (22/01/2004)

See also

 List of free software for audio
 List of Linux audio software

References

External links

Audio recording software
Free music software
Free audio editors
Audio editing software that uses GTK
Audio software with JACK support
Audio editing software for Linux